B. muris may refer to:

Brachybacterium muris, a Gram-positive bacterium.
Mycoplasma haemomuris, (formerly Bartonella muris) a Gram-negative bacterium.